Dongguan Middle School-SSL School (Chinese Simplified: 东莞中学松山湖学校, Traditional: 東莞中學松山湖學校) is a middle school located in Dongguan, Guangdong. It attaches to the Bureau of Education of Dongguan. In 2014, it became one of the top ranked middle schools in Guangdong. The school has two main campuses: a junior high school campus that provides classes from grade 7–9; and a senior high school campus that covers grade 10–12.

Dongguan Middle School-SSL School was founded in 2005. It inherited the tradition of Dongguan Middle School. The school motto is "Study Genuinely, Develop Nobly". (Chinese Simplified: 为学以真，立身以诚, Traditional: 為學以真，立身以誠) It advocates independent, harmonious and common development.

The school holds diverse festivals every 2 years, including sports, technology, fine arts and reading.

The main subjects of the school are: Chinese, mathematics, English, political science, history, biology, geography, chemistry and physics.

External links

References

Schools in Guangdong